The 74th New York State Legislature, consisting of the New York State Senate and the New York State Assembly, met from January 7 to July 11, 1851, during the first year of Washington Hunt's governorship, in Albany.

Background
Under the provisions of the New York Constitution of 1846, 32 Senators were elected in single-seat senatorial districts for a two-year term, the whole Senate being renewed biennially. The senatorial districts (except those in New York City) were made up of entire counties. 128 Assemblymen were elected in single-seat districts to a one-year term, the whole Assembly being renewed annually. The Assembly districts were made up of entire towns, or city wards, forming a contiguous area, all in the same county. The City and County of New York was divided into four senatorial districts, and 16 Assembly districts.

At this time there were two major political parties: the Democratic Party and the Whig Party. The Whigs were split into two opposing factions: the Seward/Weed faction (the majority, opposed to the Compromise of 1850) and the "Silver Grays" (supporters of President Millard Fillmore and his compromise legislation, led by Francis Granger whose silver gray hair originated the faction's nickname). The Anti-Rent Party mostly endorsed Whig or Democratic nominees. The radical abolitionists appeared as the Liberty Party.

Elections
The New York state election, 1850 was held on November 5.

Washington Hunt (Whig) was elected governor; and Sanford E. Church (Dem.) was elected lieutenant governor. The other three statewide elective offices up for election were carried by the Democrats.

82 Whigs, 44 Democrats and 2 Independents were elected to the State Assembly.

Sessions
The Legislature met for the regular session at the Old State Capitol in Albany on January 7, 1851; and adjourned on April 17.

Henry J. Raymond (Whig) was elected Speaker with 80 votes against 42 for Noble S. Elderkin (Dem.). Richard U. Sherman (W) was elected Clerk of the Assembly with 81 votes against 44 for the incumbent James R. Rose (D).

On February 4, the Legislature failed to elect a U.S. Senator to succeed Daniel S. Dickinson (Dem.), and the seat became vacant on March 4, 1851.

On February 25, Joseph B. Varnum, Jr. was elected Speaker pro tempore, to preside over the Assembly during the absence of Speaker Raymond.

On March 3, Senator William A. Dart questioned the right of Marius Schoonmaker to keep his seat in the Senate. Schoonmaker had been elected to Congress at the last State election, but Congress would not actually meet until December. After some debate, the Senate decided on March 5 that Schoonmaker "is a member of the present Senate... and will remain so, until he accepts the office of member of Congress, or until he otherwise vacates his seat in the Senate."

On March 19, the Legislature elected Hamilton Fish (W) to the vacant seat in the U.S. Senate.

On April 17, twelve Democratic state senators resigned, leaving the Senate without the necessary quorum of two-thirds to pass "An Act to provide for the completion of the Erie canal enlargement, and the Black River and Genesee Valley canals".

On May 27, a special election was held to fill the vacancies in the State Senate. Six of the resigned senators were re-elected; five vacancies were filled with men who later voted for the passage of the bill; and one election resulted in a tie.

The Legislature met for a special session on June 10, 1851; and adjourned on July 11.

Due to ill health, Speaker Raymond did not attend the special session, and Joseph B. Varnum Jr. was again elected Speaker pro tempore, to preside over the Assembly during the special session.

On June 24, the Canal Enlargement Bill was passed in the Senate by a vote of 22 to 8.

On July 2, the Whig majority admitted their party fellow Wiliam J. Gilbert to the vacant seat.

State Senate

Districts

 1st District: Queens, Richmond and Suffolk counties
 2nd District: Kings County
 3rd District: 1st, 2nd, 3rd, 4th, 5th and 6th wards of New York City
 4th District: 7th, 10th, 13th and 17th wards of New York City
 5th District: 8th, 9th and 14th wards of New York City
 6th District: 11th, 12th, 15th, 16th, 18th, 19th, 20th, 21st and 22nd wards of New York City
 7th District: Putnam,  Rockland and Westchester counties
 8th District: Columbia and Dutchess counties
 9th District: Orange and Sullivan counties
 10th District: Greene and Ulster counties
 11th District: Albany and Schenectady counties
 12th District: Rensselaer County
 13th District: Saratoga and Washington counties
 14th District: Clinton, Essex and Warren counties
 15th District: Franklin and St. Lawrence counties
 16th District: Fulton, Hamilton, Herkimer and Montgomery counties
 17th District: Delaware and Schoharie counties
 18th District: Chenango and Otsego counties
 19th District: Oneida County
 20th District: Madison and Oswego counties
 21st District: Jefferson and Lewis counties
 22nd District: Onondaga County
 23rd District: Broome, Cortland and Tioga counties
 24th District: Cayuga and Wayne counties
 25th District: Seneca, Tompkins and Yates counties
 26th District: Chemung and Steuben counties
 27th District: Monroe County
 28th District: Genesee, Niagara and Orleans counties
 29th District: Livingston and Ontario counties
 30th District: Allegany and Wyoming counties
 31st District: Erie County
 32nd District: Cattaraugus and Chautauqua counties

Note: There are now 62 counties in the State of New York. The counties which are not mentioned in this list had not yet been established, or sufficiently organized, the area being included in one or more of the abovementioned counties.

Members
The asterisk (*) denotes members of the previous Legislature who continued in office as members of this Legislature. Caleb Lyon and Moses P. Hatch changed from the Assembly to the Senate between the regular and the special session.

Employees
 Clerk: William H. Bogart
 Sergeant-at-Arms: George W. Bull
 Doorkeeper: Ransom Van Valkenburgh
 Assistant Doorkeeper: George A. Loomis

State Assembly

Assemblymen
The asterisk (*) denotes members of the previous Legislature who continued as members of this Legislature.

Party affiliations follow the vote on Speaker.

Employees
 Clerk: Richard U. Sherman
 Sergeant-at-Arms: Willett B. Goddard
 Doorkeeper: Samuel R. Tuell
 First Assistant Doorkeeper: John Parks
 Second Assistant Doorkeeper: Thomas E. Osborn

Notes

Sources
 The New York Civil List compiled by Franklin Benjamin Hough (Weed, Parsons and Co., 1858) [pg. 109 for Senate districts; pg. 136 for senators; pg. 148–157 for Assembly districts; pg. 240ff for assemblymen]
 Journal of the Senate (74th Session) (1851)
 Journal of the Assembly (74th Session) (1851, Vol. I)

074
1851 in New York (state)
1851 U.S. legislative sessions